Francis G. Peay (May 23, 1944 – September 21, 2013) was an American football offensive tackle and head coach.

Peay played college football at the University of Missouri and was selected in the first round of the 1966 NFL Draft by the New York Giants.  He also played for the Green Bay Packers and Kansas City Chiefs.

After his playing career, Peay served as the head football coach at Northwestern University from 1986 to 1991.  He was the second black head coach in the Big Ten Conference, after his predecessor Dennis Green.  His coaching record at Northwestern was 13 wins, 51 losses, and two ties.  This ranks him 12th at Northwestern in total wins and 24th at Northwestern in winning percentage. He was succeeded at Northwestern in 1992 by Gary Barnett. After leaving Northwestern, he spent two seasons as the defensive line coach under Ted Marchibroda for the Indianapolis Colts.

Peay died on September 21, 2013 at the age of 69.

Head coaching record

References

External links
 
 

1944 births
2013 deaths
American football offensive tackles
Green Bay Packers players
Kansas City Chiefs players
New York Giants players
Northwestern Wildcats football coaches
Notre Dame Fighting Irish football coaches
Missouri Tigers football players
Sportspeople from Pittsburgh
Coaches of American football from Pennsylvania
Players of American football from Pittsburgh
African-American coaches of American football
African-American players of American football
Burials at Allegheny Cemetery
20th-century African-American sportspeople
21st-century African-American people